Shibam Kawkaban District is a district of the Al Mahwit Governorate, Yemen. As of 2003, the district had a population of 39,163 inhabitants.

See also
 Middle East
 Shibam District
 South Arabia

References

Districts of Al Mahwit Governorate